The 2018 Copa Sudamericana second stage was played from 17 July to 16 August 2018. A total of 32 teams competed in the second stage to decide the 16 places in the final stages of the 2018 Copa Sudamericana.

Draw

The draw for the second stage was held on 4 June 2018, 20:00 PYT (UTC−4), at the CONMEBOL Convention Centre in Luque, Paraguay. For the second stage, the teams were allocated to two pots according to their previous results in this season:
Pot 1: 10 teams transferred from the Copa Libertadores and six best winners of the first stage from the Copa Sudamericana
Pot 2: 16 remaining winners of the first stage from the Copa Sudamericana

The 32 teams were drawn into 16 ties (O1–O16) between a team from Pot 1 and a team from Pot 2, with the teams from Pot 1 hosting the second leg. Teams from the same association could be drawn into the same tie.

The following were the 10 teams transferred from the Copa Libertadores (two best teams eliminated in the third stage of qualifying and eight third-placed teams in the group stage).

The following were the 22 winners of the first stage from the Copa Sudamericana. Matches in the first stage were considered for the ranking of teams for the second stage draw.

Format

In the second stage, each tie was played on a home-and-away two-legged basis. If tied on aggregate, the away goals rule would be used. If still tied, extra time would not be played, and the penalty shoot-out would be used to determine the winner (Regulations Article 27).

The 16 winners of the second stage advanced to the round of 16 of the knockout stages.

Matches
The first legs were played on 17–19, 25–26 July, and 1–2 August, and the second legs were played on 24, 31 July, 1–2, 7–9 and 14–16 August 2018.

|}

Notes

Match O1

Millonarios won 5–1 on aggregate and advanced to the round of 16 (Match A).

Match O2

Botafogo won 3–2 on aggregate and advanced to the round of 16 (Match B).

Match O3

Nacional won 1–0 on aggregate and advanced to the round of 16 (Match C).

Match O4

Tied 1–1 on aggregate, Colón won on penalties and advanced to the round of 16 (Match D).

Match O5

Banfield won 2–1 on aggregate and advanced to the round of 16 (Match E).

Match O6

Fluminense won 3–0 on aggregate and advanced to the round of 16 (Match F).

Match O7

Atlético Paranaense won 6–1 on aggregate and advanced to the round of 16 (Match G).

Match O8

Deportivo Cali won 6–1 on aggregate and advanced to the round of 16 (Match H).

Match O9

LDU Quito won 3–2 on aggregate and advanced to the round of 16 (Match H).

Match O10

Caracas won 6–3 on aggregate and advanced to the round of 16 (Match G).

Match O11

Tied 4–4 on aggregate, Deportivo Cuenca won on penalties and advanced to the round of 16 (Match F).

Match O12

Defensa y Justicia won 2–1 on aggregate and advanced to the round of 16 (Match E).

Match O13

Tied 1–1 on aggregate, Junior won on penalties and advanced to the round of 16 (Match D).

Match O14

San Lorenzo won 3–1 on aggregate and advanced to the round of 16 (Match C).

Match O15

Bahia won 3–1 on aggregate and advanced to the round of 16 (Match B).

Match O16

Santa Fe won 2–0 on aggregate and advanced to the round of 16 (Match A).

Notes

References

External links
CONMEBOL Sudamericana 2018, CONMEBOL.com

2
July 2018 sports events in South America
August 2018 sports events in South America